Spas or SPAS may refer to:

 Spa, a therapeutic water treatment

Geography
Spas, Russia, several rural localities in Russia
Spas, Lviv Raion, Lviv Oblast, a village in Lviv Raion in Lviv Oblast, Ukraine
Spas, Sambir Raion, Lviv Oblast, a village in Sambir Raion in Lviv Oblast, Ukraine
Spas, Debar, a village in Debar municipality, Republic of Macedonia

Nationalism
Spas (TV channel), a Russian Orthodox TV channel
The Savior (paramilitary organization) (Spas)
Serbian Patriotic Alliance (SPAS)

Other
Spas (soup), popular in Armenia
Alférez FAP Alfredo Vladimir Sara Bauer Airport (ICAO: SPAS), in Peru
Shuttle pallet satellite (SPaS)

See also
Franchi SPAS-12, a make of shotgun
Franchi SPAS-15, a make of shotgun

Spa (disambiguation)